The Alabama Military Academy is a National Guard officer candidate training school located at the Fort McClellan Army National Guard Training Center in Fort McClellan, Alabama. It was established in 1957 and has the motto "It shall be done." The training center celebrated Fort McClellan's 100th anniversary in 2017. Cadets participate in a six-mile march at Talladega Superspeedway.

Notable alumni

 Tulsi Gabbard, member of the United States House of Representatives from Hawaii; first woman to finish as the distinguished honor graduate in the Academy's 50-year history.

Controversy
On February 13, 2009, comedian Sacha Baron Cohen (in character as Brüno) fooled Guard officers into allowing him to participate in training at the Alabama Military Academy at Fort McClellan. The officers were led to believe that Cohen was a reporter making a German TV documentary. The incident ended when an Alabama cadet recognized Cohen. Guard spokesperson Staff Sergeant Katrina Timmons stated on March 16, 2009 about the incident, "It's an embarrassment to the Alabama National Guard. Since then we have put in protocols to make sure this doesn't happen again."

References

Military academies of the United States
Educational institutions established in 1957
1957 establishments in Alabama